Jack Carlson may refer to:

Jack Carlson (ice hockey) (born 1954), retired American ice hockey forward
Jack Carlson (rowing) (born 1987), United States national team rower